Gendarme Mountain is a summit in Alberta, Canada.

The mountain keeps watch over the area like a gendarme, hence the name.

References

Two-thousanders of Alberta
Alberta's Rockies